Majid Hosseinipour (born 1967 in Mashhad, Iran) is a retired Iranian football player. After retirement he managed several clubs including Payam Khorasan and more recently Sanat Gaz Sarakhs F.C.

Playing career
He played for Payam Mashhad for 16 years, then spent a year playing for F.C. Aboomoslem before spending two years with Zobahan F.C.

Managerial career
After retirement Hosseinipour coached Payam U23 for 2 years. In the next 6 years he was assistant coach of Payam Mashhad F.C. under notable managers such as Nader Dastneshan, Faraz Kamalvand, Reza Vatankhah, Hashem Rahbazan, Ali Hanteh, Hadi Bargizar and Khodadad Azizi. He was briefly head coach of Payam Mashhad from January to February 2009 and more recently was briefly head coach of Sanat Gaz Sarakhs F.C. until November 2010. He holds an AFC approved coaching certificate.

References

Iranian football managers
Iranian footballers
F.C. Aboomoslem players
Payam Mashhad players
Zob Ahan Esfahan F.C. players
Sportspeople from Mashhad
1967 births
Living people
Association football midfielders